Hasanabad-e Sanjabi (also Romanized as Ḩasanābād-e Sanjābī) is a village in Nurali Rural District, in the Central District of Delfan County, Lorestan Province, Iran. At the 2006 census, its population was 553, in 112 families.

References 

Towns and villages in Delfan County